Lin-ay sang Negros 2007, the 13th edition of the annual Lin-ay sang Negros pageant was held on April 20, 2007 at the Pana-ad Stadium. A total of 24 candidates from all over Negros Occidental joined the pageant. Lin-ay sang Negros 2006 Jan Nicole Puentebella of Bacolod City, along with Juan Miguel Zubiri and Tessie Aquino-Oreta crowned her successor, Christer Mari Taclobos of Bacolod City at the end of the event.

Final Results

Contestants

Other Significant Notes

Host
TJ Trinidad

Historical Significance
1.) Bacolod made a back-to-back win; Jan Nicole Puentebella-2006, Christer Mari Taclobos-2007.

References

Beauty pageants in the Philippines
Culture of Negros Occidental
2007 beauty pageants
2007 in the Philippines